São João (English: Saint John) was a Portuguese parish (freguesia) in the municipality of Lisbon. It was created on February 7, 1959, but with the 2012 Administrative Reform the parish merged with the Penha de França parish that kept its name.

Main sites
Santos-o-Novo Convent
Santa Apolónia Fort

References

Former parishes of Lisbon